The 41st parallel north is a circle of latitude that is 41 degrees north of the Earth's equatorial plane. It crosses Europe, the Mediterranean Sea, Asia, the Pacific Ocean, North America, and the Atlantic Ocean.

At this latitude the sun is visible for 15 hours, 8 minutes during the summer solstice and 9 hours, 13 minutes during the winter solstice.

Around the world
Starting at the prime meridian and heading eastwards, the parallel 41° north passes through:

{| class="wikitable plainrowheaders"
! scope="col" width="125" | Co-ordinates
! scope="col" | Country, territory or sea
! scope="col" | Notes
|-
| 
! scope="row" | 
|
|-
| style="background:#b0e0e6;" | 
! scope="row" style="background:#b0e0e6;" | Mediterranean Sea
| style="background:#b0e0e6;" |
|-
| 
! scope="row" | 
| Island of Asinara
|-
| style="background:#b0e0e6;" | 
! scope="row" style="background:#b0e0e6;" | Mediterranean Sea
| style="background:#b0e0e6;" | Gulf of Asinara
|-
| 
! scope="row" | 
| Island of Sardinia
|-
| style="background:#b0e0e6;" | 
! scope="row" style="background:#b0e0e6;" | Mediterranean Sea
| style="background:#b0e0e6;" | Tyrrhenian Sea - passing just north of the Pontine Islands, 
|-
| 
! scope="row" | 
|
|-
| style="background:#b0e0e6;" | 
! scope="row" style="background:#b0e0e6;" | Adriatic Sea
| style="background:#b0e0e6;" |
|-
| 
! scope="row" | 
| The border with North Macedonia is in Lake Ohrid
|-
| 
! scope="row" | 
|
|-
| 
! scope="row" | 
|
|-
| 
! scope="row" | 
| Passing through the Sea of Marmara, and through Istanbul
|-
| style="background:#b0e0e6;" | 
! scope="row" style="background:#b0e0e6;" | Black Sea
| style="background:#b0e0e6;" |
|-
| 
! scope="row" | 
|
|-
| style="background:#b0e0e6;" | 
! scope="row" style="background:#b0e0e6;" | Black Sea
| style="background:#b0e0e6;" |
|-
| 
! scope="row" | 
|
|-
| 
! scope="row" | 
|
|-
| 
! scope="row" | 
| Barkhudali exclave
|-
| 
! scope="row" | 
|-
| 
! scope="row" | 
|
|-
| style="background:#b0e0e6;" | 
! scope="row" style="background:#b0e0e6;" | Caspian Sea
| style="background:#b0e0e6;" |
|-
| 
! scope="row" | 
| Passing through Turkmenbashi
|-
| 
! scope="row" | 
|
|-
| 
! scope="row" | 
|
|-
| 
! scope="row" | 
| For about 
|-
| 
! scope="row" | 
| For about 
|-
| 
! scope="row" | 
|
|-
| 
! scope="row" | 
| For about 
|-
| 
! scope="row" | 
|
|-
| 
! scope="row" | 
|
|-
| 
! scope="row" | 
| Xinjiang
|-
| 
! scope="row" | 
| For about 
|-valign="top"
| 
! scope="row" | 
|-
| 
! scope="row" | 
|Jagang ProvinceYanggang Province Passing Through Kaema Plateau South Hamgyeong Province - Heocheon, DancheonNorth Hamgyeong Province
|-
| style="background:#b0e0e6;" | 
! scope="row" style="background:#b0e0e6;" | Sea of Japan
| style="background:#b0e0e6;" |
|-valign="top"
| 
! scope="row" | 
| Aomori Prefecture - Tsugaru Peninsula
|-
| style="background:#b0e0e6;" | 
! scope="row" style="background:#b0e0e6;" | Aomori Bay
| style="background:#b0e0e6;" |
|-valign="top"
| 
! scope="row" | 
| Natsudomari Peninsula - Aomori Prefecture
|-
| style="background:#b0e0e6;" | 
! scope="row" style="background:#b0e0e6;" | Mutsu Bay
| style="background:#b0e0e6;" |
|-valign="top"
| 
! scope="row" | 
| Shimokita Peninsula - Aomori Prefecture
|-
|-valign="top"
| style="background:#b0e0e6;" | 
! scope="row" style="background:#b0e0e6;" | Pacific Ocean
| style="background:#b0e0e6;" |
|-valign="top"
| 
! scope="row" | 
| California Nevada - passing just north of Winnemucca Utah Wyoming / Utah border Wyoming / Colorado border Nebraska / Colorado border Nebraska Iowa Illinois Indiana Ohio - southern boundary of Connecticut Western Reserve Pennsylvania New Jersey New York Connecticut
|-
| style="background:#b0e0e6;" | 
! scope="row" style="background:#b0e0e6;" | Long Island Sound
| style="background:#b0e0e6;" |
|-
| 
! scope="row" | 
| New York - Long Island
|-
| style="background:#b0e0e6;" | 
! scope="row" style="background:#b0e0e6;" | Atlantic Ocean
| style="background:#b0e0e6;" |
|-
| 
! scope="row" | 
|-
| 
! scope="row" | 
| Passing just north of Salamanca
|}

United States

In the United States, the parallel defines the southernmost border of Wyoming (bordering Utah and Colorado), and part of the border between Nebraska and Colorado.

In 1606, King James I of England created the Colony of Virginia. He gave the London Company the right to " The Jamestown Settlement was established roughly at the midpoint of that territory. The later Pilgrim (Plymouth Colony) settlers were originally bound for the northern portion of the Virginia territory. Instead, they landed north of the 41st parallel on Cape Cod, where they had exclusive rights to the land under the charter for the Plymouth Colony.

As originally set by King Charles II of England in 1664, the point at which the 41st parallel crosses the Hudson River marks the northeastern border between New Jersey and New York. This border then proceeds northwest to the Tri-States Monument at the confluence of the Delaware and Neversink rivers.

The 41st parallel was also one of the principal baselines used for surveying a portion of lands in Ohio. This marked the southern boundary of the Connecticut Western Reserve and the Firelands using the western boundary with Pennsylvania as the principal meridian. It also served as the baseline for a later survey of Ohio land north of the Greenville Treaty line up to the Fulton line which was the original boundary between Michigan and Ohio under the Northwest Ordinance (see the Toledo Strip). The later survey used the boundary with Indiana as the meridian.

See also
 40th parallel north
 42nd parallel north

References 

n41
Borders of Wyoming
Borders of Utah
Borders of Colorado
Borders of Nebraska